Thinkhaya (also known as Uzana) was governor of Pagan (Bagan), a vassal state of Ava. According to the royal chronicles, he was governor of Pagan from at least since 1390 and at least until 1410 when he fought in the Forty Years' War against the southern Hanthawaddy Kingdom.

He was the father of Gov. Saw Shwe Khet of Prome, Queen Soe Min Wimala Dewi of Hanthawaddy, Queen Atula Thiri Maha Yaza Dewi of Ava, Cmdr. Uzana of the Southern Cavalry, and Gov. Thinkhaya of Sagu. He was also the maternal grandfather of King Leik Munhtaw of Hanthawaddy and King Thihathura of Ava.

Thinkhaya was succeeded by Tarabya as governor of Pagan in 1413. It is unclear if he had died or was replaced.

Notes

References

Bibliography
 
 

Ava dynasty